The 1983 All-Ireland Senior Football Championship was the 97th staging of the All-Ireland Senior Football Championship, the Gaelic Athletic Association's premier inter-county Gaelic football tournament. The championship began on 15 May 1983 and ended on 18 September 1983.

Offaly entered the championship as the defending champions, however, they were defeated by Dublin in the Leinster final.

On 18 September 1983, Dublin won the championship following a 1-10 to 1-8 defeat of Galway in the All-Ireland final. This was their 21st All-Ireland title and their first in six championship seasons.

Dublin's Barney Rock was the championship's top scorer with 6-27. Dublin's Tommy Drumm was the choice for Texaco Footballer of the Year.

Results

Connacht Senior Football Championship

Quarter-finals

Semi-finals

Final

Leinster Senior Football Championship

First round

Quarter-final

Semi-finals

Final

Munster Senior Football Championship

Quarter-finals

 

Semi-finals

 

Final

Ulster Senior Football Championship

Preliminary round

Quarter-finals

Semi-finals

Final

All-Ireland Senior Football Championship

Semi-finals

Final

Championship statistics

Scoring

Overall

Top scorers in a single game

Miscellaneous

 After losing eight consecutive Munster finals, Cork finally defeated Kerry by 3-10 to 3-9 to take the provincial title for the first time since 1974.
 The Dublin vs Cork All Ireland semi-final replay was played at Pairc Ui Chaoimh, Cork was the last to be outside Croke Park, Dublin until 2014. It was also the first All-Ireland semi-final replay to be played outside Croke Park since 1941.
 The All-Ireland final has gone down as the most ill-disciplined decider in championship history. Dubbed the Game of Shame, four players were sent off - three from the Dublin team and one from Galway. Although the official attendance was 71,988 there was overcrowding on both terraces with many supporters failing to get into the ground.

References